Pebble Baye is a resort village in the Canadian province of Saskatchewan within Census Division No. 16. It is on the shores of Iroquois Lake in the Rural Municipality of Leask No. 464.

History 
Pebble Baye incorporated as a resort village on January 1, 1983.

Demographics 

Government 
The Resort Village of Pebble Baye is governed by an elected municipal council and an appointed administrator. The mayor is Bonnie Kraus and its administrator is Terry Lofstrom.

See also 
List of communities in Saskatchewan
List of municipalities in Saskatchewan
List of resort villages in Saskatchewan
List of villages in Saskatchewan
List of summer villages in Alberta

References 

Resort villages in Saskatchewan
Leask No. 464, Saskatchewan
Division No. 16, Saskatchewan